Lake Kopiago Rural LLG a local-level government (LLG) of Koroba-Kopiago District in Hela Province, Papua New Guinea.

Wards
01. Haredege
02. Arou
03. Hagini/Poko
04. Horale/Karuka
05. Aluni
06. Agali/Bulako
07. Hirane/Barae
08. Alukuni
09. Kopiago Station
10. Suwaka
11. Dolowa/Hukuni
12. Dilini
13. Peragola
14. Wagia
15. Usai/Malieli
16. Wiski
17. Wanakipi
18. Ambi
19. Yokona

References 

Local-level governments of Hela Province